The 2006 Badminton World Cup was the twenty-first edition of the international Badminton World Cup tournament. The event was held at the Olympic Sports Park in Yiyang, Hunan, China from 24 to 28 October 2006. It was organized by the Table Tennis and Badminton Administration Center under General Administration of Sport of China, hosted by the Hunan Sports Bureau and the Yiyang People's Government, and also co-organized by China Mobile Group Hunan Co., Ltd., with a total prize money of US$250,000. Some of top players declined to participate, since there is no ranking points awarded in this tournament, and tight competition schedule at that year, with also held the World Championship, Thomas & Uber Cup, Asian Games, and the European Club League. In the end, the host Chinese national team won the men's singles, women's singles and women's doubles, while the men's and mixed doubles won by Indonesian players.

Medalists

Men's singles

Group A

Group B

Group C

Group D

Finals

Women's singles

Group A

Group B

Group C

Group D

Finals

Men's doubles

Group A

Group B

Finals

Women's doubles

Group A

Group B

Finals

Mixed doubles

Group A

Group B

Finals

References 

Badminton World Cup
World Cup
Yiyang
Badminton World Cup
Sport in Hunan
International sports competitions hosted by China
Badminton tournaments in China